The Boston Camera Club is the leading amateur photographic organization in Boston, Massachusetts and vicinity. Founded in 1881, it offers activities of interest to amateur photographers, especially digital photography. It meets weekly from September to June.  Membership is by dues.  Anyone may join.  Meetings are open free to the public.

History

Photography was introduced in 1839.  For some decades it involved laborious daguerreotype followed by wet-plate and other processes.  Amateur photography in the United States got its first major boost in 1880 when the future Eastman Kodak Co. and others introduced dry plates—glass plates with pre-applied chemical emulsion.  In 1888 Kodak introduced flexible media—first paper and soon film—and third-party processing. These innovations brought photography to the masses. Still, professionals and advanced amateurs typically continued to use glass plates until the early 20th century, when film was universally accepted. Today most photography, including in the club, is digital.

Boston Society of Amateur Photographers, 1881

The club known today as the Boston Camera Club was founded October 7, 1881 in Boston as the Boston Society of Amateur Photographers.  It is the oldest continuously active camera club founded by amateurs, and the second-oldest active camera club, in the U.S.  Present at the October 7 meeting were F. H. Blair, James M. Codman, W. C. Greenough, A. P. Howard, Lucius L. Hubbard, Frederick Ober, and John H. Thurston, with Thurston having the most active role. At first temporary officers were elected.  On November 9, 1881 in a Boston newspaper, the group solicited support from anyone else interested.  Accordingly another nascent group, comprising James F. Babcock, William T. Brigham, Wilfred A. French, William A. Hovey, and others, joined them.  The combined group met on November 18, 1881 and permanent officers were elected—Brigham president, Babcock vice president, and French secretary and treasurer. Babcock was a professor of chemistry; French and Thurston Boston photographic suppliers; Hovey a newspaper editor. The other names beg inquiry.  As photographers, all are believed to be amateurs.  At first the club met in various places, including the offices of Hovey's Boston Sunday Budget newspaper. Later Massachusetts Institute of Technology (MIT), then located in Boston, became a regular meeting place.  Dues were not particularly low for the time—$5 annually plus a $3 admission fee.

Boston Camera Club, 1886

As amateur photography in the United States became more established, in 1886 the club changed its name to Boston Camera Club. The first regular (all-member) meeting of the renamed club was held October 7, 1886. On April 6, 1887 it incorporated in the Commonwealth of Massachusetts, as the state styles itself, under the new name, stating as its purpose the furthering of "the knowledge of photography in all its branches and the promotion of social intercourse among the amateur photographers of Boston and vicinity."  The first president (1886–1890) of the incorporated club was electric products manufacturer George Edward Cabot.  As of 1888 the club had 64 members. By the end of the 19th century it was typically closer to 100.  By now, dues were expensive—$20 annually.

50 Bromfield Street

Starting in 1886 the Boston Camera Club rented permanent headquarters at 50 Bromfield Street, Boston for some three-and-a-half decades.  It may have been selected by being the business address of both club founder Thurston, a photo supplier, and early vice president Charles Henry Currier, a jeweler and commercial photographer.  It was also conveniently located near downtown photo-supply stores.  The club had eight rooms:

There is a well-selected library ...; a large exhibition gallery ...; a studio ... fitted with screens, cameras, and two of the finest Dallmeyer portrait lenses, also a fine double stereopticon; an enlarging room, with apparatus for making bromide enlargements, enlarged negatives and lantern slides by the use of an electric arc light; dark rooms....

Apparently the building had an elevator.  At 50 Bromfield the club held public exhibitions of work by its members and guest photographers.

Early 20th-century difficulties

In 1899 Boston-based journal Photo-Era, launched in 1898, said it had been "elected" the official organ of the Boston Camera Club.  The club's Joseph Prince Loud was on the journal's first board.  In 1907–1920 the editor was the club's first permanent secretary and treasurer, photo supplier Wilfred A. French, son of Boston daguerreotypist Benjamin French. French continued as editor until at least 1924.

For reasons begging research, by 1908 the Boston Camera Club was facing difficulties, Photo-Era saying it had been "long been on the sick list". Although it remained active, holding member exhibitions until at least 1912, minutes of 1913 by longtime secretary Thurston confirm membership had declined and its future was under discussion.  Business meetings continued, but apparently far fewer regular meetings. The club was kept alive by Frank Roy Fraprie (FRAYP-ree), Phineas Hubbard (president 1908–1913, possibly longer), Horace A. Latimer, and the aging Thurston. The club, it is believed in 1924, left its longstanding 50 Bromfield Street location and for some years met at the Boston Young Men's Christian Union (YMCU).  Amateur photography in Boston now seems to have been dominated by three entities—the Boston YMCU Camera Club (a different entity than Boston Camera Club's meetings at YMCU), active from 1908 to at least the 1920s; Boston Photo-Clan, active about 1912–1921 and mentored by Boston commercial photographer John H. Garo at whose studio it met, of which Fraprie was a member as well; and The Society of Arts and Crafts, Boston.

Horace A. Latimer bequest, 1931

In 1931 a bequest by longtime club member Horace A. Latimer of Boston, an independently wealthy amateur photographer of some renown, for reasons begging research, dramatically reinvigorated the Boston Camera Club.  Membership rebounded, and with the return of servicemen after World War II it reached 286 in 1946.  With the funds the club would purchase new headquarters. Temporarily it moved to 330 Newbury Street in the Back Bay section of Boston.

351A Newbury Street, 1934–1980

In 1934, with part of Horace Latimer's bequest the Boston Camera Club purchased and moved into another building, at nearby 351A Newbury Street, Back Bay. The club occupied three floors. There were a large and small exhibition gallery, darkroom, library, and kitchen. Public exhibitions of photography resumed.  For tax purposes, in 1946 the club decided to sell no. 351A and remain in the building as a lessee.  Growth continued apace, reaching 547 in 1959—492 regular, 51 associate or corresponding, and 4 honorary members—a size maintained for perhaps two decades. Besides post-war prosperity, the growth is attributable to introduction of 35mm film by Kodak in the 1930s, and single lens reflex (SLR) 35mm cameras by Nikon, Pentax and others in the 1960s.  In this era, enthusiasts often sought instruction in camera use by joining a camera club.

Brookline, 1980–present

Because of the owner's pending sale of the building, in 1980 the Boston Camera Club had to vacate 351A Newbury Street. The club left Boston, relocating to the adjacent town of Brookline, Mass., where it meets today.  In 1997 it relocated again, moving across town to its present headquarters in Brookline.

Meanwhile, for the second time in its history, in the 1980s and 1990s membership declined dramatically. The trend is attributed to a number of factors—camera automation, for example autofocus and programmed exposure which reduced the need for user training; the advent of consumer video; and changing social mores.  Starting in 2006 membership rebounded again, due in large part to the club's emphasis on digital photography, increased promotion of the club, and its website.  In 2020–2022 during the worldwide coronavirus, the club held meetings and presentations online.  It has since reverted to in-person meetings.

Prominent members

Because the Boston Camera Club was founded before amateur photography was widespread, many early members were advanced practitioners.  A few made advances in photographic technology or received note for their work.

Since at least 1889 the Boston Camera Club has awarded honorary life memberships on two classes of deserving individuals: members giving extraordinary service to the club, and outside personalities in the Boston area for signal achievement in photography. As of 1889 there was one honorary member, well-known Boston studio photographer Frank Rowell.  Whether he is the first begs research.

19th century

Among the founders of the Boston Society of Amateur Photographers, as the Boston Camera Club was first known, some were noted locally, even nationally.  First permanent club vice president James F. Babcock was a Boston chemistry professor who held several U.S. patents.  Wilfred A. French, afore-noted editor and publisher of Photo-Era, was a founding member of a group called the National Historic Picture Guild. About another early vice president, one of the few professional photographers in the club, William F. Robinson claims: "Of all New England's commercial photographers, the most gifted was Charles H. Currier."

Prominent in the early club were Emma J. Fitz, painter Sarah Jane Eddy, and Maine photography pioneer Emma D. Sewall.  Honorary member George Edward Cabot, first president of the incorporated club, was a partner in the Holtzer–Cabot electric products company, Boston. Another early honorary member was late-19th century lecturer Antonie Stölle, who presented innovative color slide-illustrated lectures on works of art.

The Boston Camera Club counted two astronomers among its members, Percival Lowell and honorary member William Henry Pickering, an astrophotographer who discovered Saturn's moon Phoebe, worked on faster camera shutters for nighttime work, and furthered the cause of women in astronomy.

Painter, photographer, Boston art patron, and club member Sarah Choate Sears was named a Member of the Photo-Secession by Alfred Stieglitz. In 1899 she had a solo exhibition at the club that included a portrait of Julia Ward Howe. That year she also showed in the second Boston Arts and Crafts Exhibition.

Two collaborators of Alexander Graham Bell were honorary members of the Boston Camera Club.  Prof. Charles "Charlie" Robert Cross is believed to have taught the first electrical engineering course in the U.S., at MIT in 1882–1883.  Inventor and club vice president Francis Blake, Jr. is believed to have substantially helped the club financially in its early years.  Blake's 1877 amplifier enabled Bell's to become the predominant telephone brand in the U.S.  In 1886, two weeks after the club changed its name to Boston Camera Club, he read an important paper on camera shutters in which he did pioneering work.  Although his work was likely not yet perfected, Elton W. Hall says the paper "established him as an expert in high-speed photography". By 1890 he had achieved 1/2000-second exposure times, at which time he presented his full results to the club.

Fred Holland Day, publisher, esthete, photography lecturer and mentor, and a leading U.S. artistic photographer of the late 19th and early 20th century, joined the Boston Camera Club in 1889. His membership was recommended by Frederick Alcott Pratt, a nephew and trustee of the literary estate of Louisa May Alcott and treasurer of the club, 1891–1893. Whether it suggests persons in this era, unlike today, had to be recommended for membership, begs inquiry. Although club records on Day are scant, he maintained ties with and supported the Boston club and other area amateur photo organizations. Besides lecturing at the club, he judged at least one exhibition there, in 1906.

In 1896 a print by wealthy amateur Boston photographer Horace A. Latimer, today the club's best-remembered early member, was shown in an exhibition at the Smithsonian Institution. Latimer, a yachting and international travel photographer, is the only known Boston Camera Club member published in Camera Notes, an organ of The Camera Club of New York, to which he belonged as well. In gratitude to his 1931 bequest which revived the club's fortunes, the club's print critiques today are called the Horace A. Latimer Print Competitions.

Early 20th century

In the first half of the 20th century three Boston Camera Club members were photographic authors and publishers.  Wilfred A. French was mentioned.  The prolific Frank Roy Fraprie headed American Photographic Publishing Co. and edited annuals American Amateur Photographer and American Annual of Photography.  Honorary member Franklin Ingalls "Pop" Jordan was a photographic author and editor.  Another personality, Adolf "Papa" Fassbender, the German-born New York City educator called a "one-man photographic institution", had a career of 72 years training thousands in photography.  In 1903 club member Wendell G. Corthell was a co-founder of the Salon Club of America, an artistic photographic group in opposition to Stieglitz's Photo-Secession.  Another noted photographer was Lillian Baynes Griffin, an associate, or corresponding, member of the club, who joined in 1906.

The Boston Camera Club had members who were non-photographic artists of note practicing photography secondarily. They include Gloucester (Massachusetts) Fisherman's Memorial sculptor Leonard Craske (KRASK); prolific Cape Ann, Massachusetts etcher, photographer; and author Samuel V. Chamberlain, an honorary member who wrote at least 45 photo-illustrated travel books; painter Emil Albert Gruppé; and post-Secessionist photographer and watercolorist Eleanor Parke Custis.

Photographic author, publisher, and honorary club member Arthur Hammond won top prize from organizers of the 1939 New York World's Fair for his photo of the fair's icons, the Trylon and Perisphere.  Architect and author L. Whitney "Whit" Standish, club president, 1939–1942, was an influential honorary member who helped organize its weekly meetings, competitions, educational courses, and newsletter. Noted etcher Arthur William Heintzelman, an honorary member, was first keeper of prints of Boston Public Library.

Mid-20th & 21st centuries

One of the most well known photographic inventors in the 20th century, National Medal of Science (1973) recipient, MIT professor, and Boston Camera Club honorary member Harold E. "Doc" Edgerton greatly advanced the photographic strobe by achieving exposure times of one-millionth of a second, and had well-known extreme stop-action photographs in Life magazine. Lesser known are his night aerial strobe work for the Allied D-Day invasion in World War II, his co-founding of defense contractor EG&G, and undersea explorations with Jacques Cousteau.

In the second half of the 20th century honorary club members had photographic achievements of note. H. Bradford Washburn, Jr. was a noted mountaineer, cartographer, aerial photographer, and longtime first director of the Boston Museum of Science.  Photojournalist Arthur Griffin was the best-known photographer of New England scenes in the mid-20th century. Aeronautical engineer Henry F. Weisenburger, club president 1965–1967, a photographer since the 1940s who joined the club in 1954, was perhaps the longest-active living exponent of amateur photography in New England.  Leslie A. Campbell, a locally noted promoter of amateur photography in western Massachusetts, in 1959 founded Massachusetts Camera Naturalists, a nature photography group. Lou Jones is a Boston-based commercial, Olympic Games, and jazz photographer, a photojournalist whose books include Final Exposure: Portraits from Death Row (1996), and photography educator.  Boston news photographer and camera salesman Gordon A. Hicks is the longest-known club member at 71 years, 1938–2009.

Exhibitions

The exhibition history of the Boston Camera Club is long and somewhat complex.  The club has hosted several species of shows. There have been exhibitions by its members, joint shows with other camera clubs, exhibitions by outside photographers, and salons—judged competitive exhibitions of photography open to the international public.

Member exhibitions, 1880s–1910

About the Boston Society of Amateur Photographers, as the club was first known, Sarah Greenough says its first shows "established many of the patterns and issues that would dominate future exhibitions" of photo clubs and societies in the U.S.  In 1883 at MIT, the club held its first exhibition, an unusually large show of some 700 prints.  The second exhibition in 1884 was held at the Boston Art Club.  The third, in 1885, included male nudes, raising eyebrows in conservative Boston.  In 1892 the club exhibited in the long-running triennial exhibition of the Massachusetts Charitable Mechanic Association.  In 1893, judges in the club's annual exhibition included American painter Edmund C. Tarbell, and Boston photo studio owner and club honorary member Frank Rowell.  In the club's 7th and 10th member exhibitions in 1895 and 1898, member Emma D. Sewall won the top award.  Prominent also in the 1898 show were club members Sarah Jane Eddy and Boston personality Sarah Choate Sears.

In 1898 the Boston Camera Club exhibited 250 prints by well-known Boston photographer and club member Fred Holland Day.  About 1904 it exhibited its members' work at Day's studio in Boston. In 1904 it also helped organize, and exhibited in, a photograph exhibition at the Louisiana Purchase Exposition, the St. Louis World's Fair.  In 1907 the club showed the work of member Wendell G. Corthell.  The club's annual show of 1910, which photographic journal Photo-Era called the club's "best for many years", had prints by Eddy, Frank R. Fraprie, Horace A. Latimer, and Joseph Prince Loud.

Joint Exhibitions of Photography, 1887–1894

Concurrently, Joint Exhibitions of Photography were held, sponsored by the Boston Camera Club, Photographic Society of Philadelphia, and Society of Amateur Photographers of New York, with the venue rotating annually among the three cities. There were seven exhibitions, in 1887–1889 and 1891–1894. At first the three clubs shared in the preparation for each show.  In the first Joint Exhibition, held in New York City in 1887, Joseph P. Loud and Horace A. Latimer received the Boston club's only diplomas. In the third exhibition in Philadelphia in 1889, Boston was represented by Wilfred A. French, Horace Latimer, and William Garrison Reed.  Starting with the fourth exhibition in New York City in 1891, collaborative preparation ended and each club individually ran the exhibition in the city in which it was held. That year Latimer exhibited the most prints from the Boston club.  The fifth Joint Exhibition, held at the Boston Art Club in 1892, was a large show of over 600 objects including 18 prints by Alfred Stieglitz, future founder of the Photo-Secession, and 45 prints by Boston Camera Club member and high-speed photography pioneer Francis Blake, Jr., the first public showing of his work.  Of the sixth exhibition in Philadelphia in 1893, Stieglitz called it "without doubt, the finest exhibition of photographs ever held in the United States, and probably was but once excelled in any country."

First salon series

The Boston Camera Club has had two series of photographic salons, or competitive exhibitions. The first series was held in the first decade of the 20th century, probably for only a few years. Presently only the second salon, held in 1906, has been identified.

Boston International Exhibition of Photography, 1932–1981

After its revival by Horace Latimer's 1931 bequest, in 1932 the club launched an international competition, the Boston Salon of Photography, held 43 times over the next five decades.  In 1953 it was renamed the Boston International Exhibition of Photography, although informally it was often still called the "Boston salon." In 1953 as well, the Frank R. Fraprie Memorial Medal was created in recognition of Fraprie's role, along with Latimer, in having kept the club alive in the difficult years of 1913–1930.

At first the salon was limited to black-and-white prints.  Starting in the 1954 International Exhibition, color slides (transparencies) were admitted as well. In 1959 a color print section was added.  The 43rd and last exhibition was held in 1981, the club's centenary year. In discontinuing the international exhibitions, the club cited lack of manpower.  Whereas earlier salons typically received hundreds of entries each, the 1981 exhibition took a man-year of labor to process over 3,200 prints and slides.

Entrants of note in the Boston Salon and International Exhibition over the years include Croatian photographer Tošo Dabac, the 1937 medal winner.  Competing by the 9th Salon in 1940 were Eleanor Parke Custis, and lifelong amateur photographer, and future U.S. Senator and presidential candidate Barry Goldwater.  Noted pictorialist and longtime Baltimore Sun photographer A. Aubrey Bodine, competing by 1944, received the first Fraprie medal in 1953, winning it again in 1955 and 1959.  Competing in this era as well was 1940s pictorialist Rowena Fruth. There was also longtime competitor Wellington Lee, who competed from 1950 to the last salon in 1981; Hong Kong–American photo prodigy, actor and director Fan Ho who first competed in 1954 at age 17; and Mexican cinema director José Lorenzo Zakany Almada, who won the Boston Camera Club Medal in 1968.

Exhibition judges over the years include club members Cecil B. Atwater, Leonard Craske, Eleanor Custis, John W. Doscher, Adolf Fassbender, Arthur W. Heintzelman, Franklin I. Jordan, L. Whitney Standish, John H. Vondell, and Henry F. Weisenburger.  Guest judges include Aubrey Bodine in 1964.

Guest exhibitors

From the late 19th to at least the mid-20th century the Boston Camera Club had exhibitions by prominent outside photographers.  In 1896 it showed work by Alfred Stieglitz. In 1899 it had shows by major figures Frances Benjamin Johnston and Clarence White, the latter organized and hung by Fred Holland Day. In 1900 it showed 150 photos by Gertrude Käsebier, an associate of Fred Holland Day's. Photo-Era called it "undoubtedly the finest collection of photographs ever seen" in Boston.  Also in this era, the club exhibited the work of early English pioneer photographer Henry Peach Robinson, and German photographer Rudolph Dührkoop. There were other exhibitions by lesser-known photographers. In 1907 there was an exhibition by Frederick Haven Pratt of Worcester, Mass., a physiologist, educator, friend of Day's and, like the Boston club's Sarah Choate Sears, a Member of the Photo-Secession.

From the late 19th to early 20th century U.S. camera clubs mounted exhibitions of each other's work.  In 1908 the Boston club showed the work of two organizations in Buffalo, New York, and by the Capitol (Washington, D.C.) and Portland (Maine) Camera Clubs; and in 1909 by the Philadelphia Photographic Society.

In 1940 the Boston Camera Club exhibited the work of Edward Weston, and in 1950 Paul Gittings, Sr.  In 1953 it exhibited the 1840s work of Scottish pioneers David Octavius Hill and Robert Adamson (Hill and Adamson).

20th & 21st centuries

After the Boston Camera Club's revival in 1931 it moved temporarily to 330 Newbury Street, Boston.  Whether this space had an exhibition room is unknown.  The club's permanent facility at 351A Newbury Street, purchased in 1934, had a large gallery.  Public exhibitions of outsiders' work in this period was mentioned; member shows have not been identified.

Since 1980 when the club relocated to Brookline, Mass., it has had no gallery space, all member shows being held at venues in the Boston area. In the 1990s it exhibited at Boston City Hall, Griffin Museum of Photography, Hynes Convention Center, and elsewhere. In 2021 the club mounted its first known outdoor exhibition, an ambitious project showing the work of 88 members on a 250-foot banner in Boston's Seaport district.

Education

In discharging the mandate of its 1887 state charter to promulgate the "knowledge of photography", since the beginning the Boston Camera Club has sponsored lectures and programs by expert members and guests.  In an 1893 history of the club, member Benjamin Kimball said Boston camera manufacturer Thomas H. Blair gave the first known talk, on lenses; the year is unknown.  The first documented lecture is a paper on the history of photography read to the club on February 5, 1883 by then-president William T. Brigham.

In 1886 and 1890 club member Francis Blake, Jr. presented papers at the club on high-speed photography. In 1895 member Owen A. Eames presented his Eames Animatoscope, an early motion picture device (although one source says: "It is unlikely that projection was attempted.")  In 1897 Friedrich von Voigtländer, head of the Austrian optical firm of that surname, spoke to the club.  In 1904, likely at his studio during the club's aforementioned show there, Fred Holland Day presented a paper for which he was well known, "Is Photography a Fine Art?"  Many others lectured at the club in its early years.

Guest speakers at the club for much of the 20th century have not been identified. In the 1970s and 1980s the Boston Camera Club had presentations by Marie Cosindas and Minor White. In the 1990s it sponsored day-long courses by Lou Jones, Frans Lanting, John Sexton, and others.  Boston-area professionals including staff photographers of the Boston Globe and Boston Herald, and instructors in Boston's New England School of Photography and other institutions, have long been regular club presenters and competition judges. Since the latter 1990s the Boston Camera Club has regularly held lectures and field trips in digital photography.

Other activities

About 1888 members of the Boston Camera Club, including William Garrison Reed, undertook the Old Boston project, a "survey of buildings and farms for local archives", whose photographs, owned by the Boston Public Library, were rediscovered in 2007.

During the 1890s members of the club pursued stereo, or 3–D, photography. Lantern slides, the forerunner of 20th-century color slides, were popular as well.  As mentioned, the club owned a stereopticon projector—a projector with two lenses, capable of being used for stereo projection.  More often, its name notwithstanding, it was used in single-image projection to enable dissolve, the effect of the previous image fading as the next comes in.  In the 1940s the club brought entertainment and instruction to disabled World War II veterans at a Boston-area Army hospital.  In the 1950s and 1960s the club had a movie group and owned a movie projector.

Today

As it has for most of its existence, the Boston Camera Club meets weekly. Meetings are held at its Brookline, Massachusetts headquarters every Tuesday evening from September to June. Meetings are open free to the public.

The club emphasizes digital photography. Activities range from beginner to advanced and comprise education, print competitions and critique, live-model formal portrait sessions, field trips, and inter-club competitions. Outside speakers and competition judges are regularly invited.  The club communicates through its website and newsletter, The Reflector, launched in 1938 and published electronically.  Issues are online back to 1954 on the club's website.

The Boston Camera Club, a nonprofit educational corporation registered in the Commonwealth of Massachusetts, is a member of New England Camera Club Council and Photographic Society of America.

Records of the Boston Camera Club, 1881–1971, are held by the Boston Athenaeum and are available to researchers by appointment.

Image gallery

All images, 50 Bromfield Street, Boston.  All from Kimball, 1893 (below).

See also
 Photography
 History of photography
 History of Boston

Wikimedia

Website
 Boston Camera Club website.

Person reference

Boston Camera Club, selected honorary members
Year made honorary where known:

Cecil B. Atwater (d.1981); Edward J. Baldwin (d.201?); Francis Blake, Jr. (by 1894); Wilbur C. Brown (by 1898); Albert W. Bussewitz (d.1995); George E. Cabot (by 1894; d.1946); Leslie A. Campbell (c.1977; d.2020); Samuel V. Chamberlain; J. Eastman Chase (by 1894); Gregory A. Crisci (2012); Charles R. Cross (1892; d.1921); Harold E. Edgerton (1957 or later; d.1990); Frank R. Fraprie (d.1951); Willard P. Gerrish (by 1999; d.1930s?); Arthur Griffin; Emil A. Gruppé (d.1978); Arthur Hammond (by 1956; d.1962); Colton D. Hazard (1968; d.1989); Arthur W. Heintzelman (by 1956; d.1965); Gordon A. Hicks (1980s? d.2009); Lou Jones (2007); Frank I. Jordan (d.1956); George H. Moseley (1995; d.2015); William H. Pickering (by 1984; d.1938); Nathaniel H. Pulling (by 1977; d.2007); David F. Rodd (1993; d.2017); Frank Rowell (by 1894; d.1900); L. Whitney Standish (1968?; d.19??); Antonie Stölle (by 1899); H. Bradford Washburn, Jr. (by 1956; d.2007); Henry F. Weisenburger (1979; d.2021); Gordon Yu (2001).

Club members, outside honorifics

Life dates, selected persons mentioned
Cecil B. Atwater, 1886–1981. James F. Babcock, 1844–1897. Francis Blake, Jr., 1850–1913. Aldine Aubrey Bodine, 1906–1970. Roydon Burke, 1901–1993. George Edward Cabot, 1861–1946. Leslie A. Campbell, 1925–2020. Samuel Vance Chamberlain, 1895–1975. Daniel D. R. Charbonnet, 1943–2020. Wendell G(urney?) Corthell, 1844?–1915. Marie Cosindas, 1923–2017. Leonard Craske, 1882–1950. Charles Robert Cross, 1848–1921. Charles Henry Currier, 1851–1938. Eleanor Parke Custis, 1897–1983. Fred (sic; his birth name) Holland Day, 1864–1933. John W. Doscher, d. after 1971. Rudolph Dührkoop, 1848–1918. Sarah Jane Eddy, 1851–1945. Harold Eugene Edgerton, 1903–1990. Adolf Fassbender, 1884–1980. Frank Roy Fraprie, 1874–1951. Rowena Fruth, 1896–1983. Barry Goldwater, 1909–1998. Arthur Leo Griffin, 1903–2001. Lillian Baynes Griffin, 1871–1916. Emil Albert Gruppé, 1896–1978. Arthur Hammond, 1880–1962. Arthur William Heintzelman, 1891–1965. Gordon Adna Hicks, 1909–2009. Fan Ho, 1937–2016. Frances Benjamin Johnston, 1864–1952. Lou Jones, 1945–. Franklin Ingalls Jordan, 1876–1956. Gertrude Käsebier, 1852–1934. Horace A(lbert?) Latimer, 1860–1931. Percival Lowell, 1855–1916. Charles B. Phelps, Jr., 1891–1949. William Henry Pickering, 1858–1938. Frederick Alcott Pratt, 1863–1910. Frederick Haven Pratt, 1873–1958. Henry Peach Robinson, 1830–1901. David F. Rodd, 1948–2017. Frank Rowell (1832–1900). Sarah Carlisle Choate Sears, 1858–1935. Emma D. Sewall, 1836–1919. L. Whitney Standish, 1919–?. Alfred Stieglitz, 1864–1946. Allen G. Stimson, ?–1996. John H. Vondell, ?–c.1967. Henry Bradford Washburn, Jr., 1910–2007. Edward Weston, 1886–1958. Henry F. Weisenburger, 1924–2021. Clarence White, 1871–1925. Edmund A. Woodle, 1918–2007.

Notes

BCC denotes Boston Camera Club; GB, HT, IA online source repositories Google Books, HathiTrust, Internet Archive.

Boston Camera Club records & publications
Chronologically. BCC denotes Boston Camera Club:

Archive

General

Exhibition catalogs
Selection:

Selected other sources
For these sources cited in the Notes above, see below under:

Boston Club Book:  About club
Brigham:  Photography generally
Clark's Boston Blue Book:  About club
Fairbrother:  Members–Blake
Fanning:  Members–Day
Greenough:  Photography generally
Hall:  Members–Day
Hillyer:  About club
Kimball:  About club
Polito:  Photography generally
Robinson:  ditto

About club
▪Chronologically▪:

Members
Works about

Photograph holdings of

——————There are also institutional holdings of Harold E. Edgerton; Emil Albert Gruppé; L. Whitney Standish; H. Bradford Washburn.

Photography generally

American photography organizations
Arts organizations based in Massachusetts
Brookline, Massachusetts
Cultural history of Boston
Culture of Boston
Clubs and societies in Boston
Photography organizations established in the 19th century
Arts organizations established in 1881
1881 establishments in Massachusetts